A bi-articulated bus or double-articulated bus and sometimes train-bus or tram-bus is a type of high-capacity articulated bus with an extra axle and a second articulation joint, as well as extended length. Bi-articulated buses tend to be employed in high-frequency core routes or bus rapid transit schemes rather than in conventional bus routes.

Design considerations
Common bi-articulated buses resemble rail vehicles in design. They often have elevated train-type doors instead of traditional bus doors to use dedicated stations. Payment is typically made at a bus station using a fare gate rather than on the bus.

Compared to using multiple smaller buses on a route, challenges using a bi-articulated bus include: 
 difficulties maneuvering in traffic
 an increased turning radius
 the need to have extended length station platforms
 reduced frequency of service (one larger bus every 10 minutes rather than two regular sized buses coming once every 5 minutes) 
 less flexibility for scheduling, routing, and maintenance. 
However, a bi-articulated bus requires fewer drivers relative to the number of passengers per bus.

Early versions
In the late 1980s, the French manufacturers Renault and Heuliez Bus developed the "Mégabus" (officially the Heuliez GX237), a bi-articulated high-floor bus. The demonstrator Mégabus visited transit agencies throughout France, but the only city to order them was Bordeaux (an order of 10 buses, built in 1989). These buses, now retired, were used on Bordeaux's bus route 7 until the city's tram system opened in 2004.

Hungarian bus manufacturer Ikarus also developed a bi-articulated bus prototype, the Ikarus 293, in the early 1990s.

In Bucharest, the ITB (today the STB) operated a double articulated trolleybus (unofficially called DAC 122E), made by adding a modified section between the first and the last sections of a DAC 117E articulated trolleybus, one of the sections coming from a damaged DAC 117E. This vehicle was built to fulfill the need of high capacity person transportation, which was proving difficult for the ITB in 1988, when the prototype was made. However, the DAC 117E's 125 kW traction motor proved insufficient for such a heavy vehicle, let alone the weight of passengers when it operated at full capacity. As a result, the vehicle was very slow and had trouble operating on grades, especially the incline between Cișmigiu Park and University Square. It also had trouble making sharp turns and was difficult to control, especially on snow or ice. This trolleybus was operated on long lines with wide roads and no major turns except the end of the lines like 69 and 90, but occasionally entered on lines 85, 66, 79 and 86. Bucharest traffic became increasingly intense in the very late 1990s, and RATB sought shorter trolleybuses. The DAC 122E was withdrawn from regular service, being occasionally used on lines 69 and 90 until 2000 when it was fully removed from service, displaced by the then-new Ikarus 415Ts and scrapped. Bucharest no longer operates bi-articulated vehicles (except for trams) due to high traffic levels, which is also the reason why between 2007 and 2018, the RATB refused to operate normal articulated buses.

Use 

A bi-articulated bus is a long vehicle and usually requires a specially trained driver, as maneuvering (particularly reversing) can be difficult. Articulated electric trolleybuses can be difficult to control, with their motors producing momentary peak power in excess of 600 kilowatts (816 PS; 805 hp). The trailer section of a "puller" bus can be subject to unusual centripetal forces, which many people can find uncomfortable, although this is not an issue with "pushers". Bi-articulated buses are difficult to reverse park as joints force the bus into a zig-zag shape.

The transit system that has used bi-articulated buses the longest is the Rede Integrada de Transporte, in Curitiba, Brazil, which provides a type of service that has come to be known – particularly in American English – as bus rapid transit (BRT), where buses run in dedicated lanes and stop only at enclosed stations. Use of bi-articulated buses began in 1992, with vehicles manufactured by Volvo (chassis) and Marcopolo/Ciferal (body), able to carry up to 270 passengers. Each bi-articulated bus is equipped with five doors where passengers can quickly load and unload. Buses stop only at enclosed, tube-shaped stations, where passengers pre-pay the fare and then board at the same level as the vehicle floor. Curitiba has over 170 bi-articulated buses in operation on routes serving five main corridors of dedicated bus lanes. These buses run on an average period of 50 seconds during peak hours.

Australia 
They are planned to be operating on Brisbane Metro which will open in the future.

Belgium
On 28 June 2020, the Flemish regional public transport company De Lijn inaugurated the Ringtrambus (route 820) between Brussels Airport and Jette via Vilvoorde, operated half-hourly by 14 24-metre double-articulated buses. The service is presented as a step towards the tramline that was originally proposed.

Brazil
The Brazilian bus body manufacturers Marcopolo, CAIO, Busscar and most lately Neobus have made many bi-articulated buses on top of Volvo chassis. They are currently used in Rio de Janeiro, São Paulo, Campinas, Goiânia, Curitiba and, outside of Brazil, in Bogotá, Colombia.

In November 2016, Volvo launched the Volvo Gran Artic 300 bi-bus chassis, specifically developed in Brazil for BRT systems.

Canada
In November 2019, Quebec City's Réseau de transport de la Capitale announced that it is planning to open the city's first BRT line along Boulevard Charest by 2026, utilizing a fleet of bi-articulated electric buses. Quebec City is the first and only North American city to make such an announcement.

China
The Chinese manufacturer Youngman developed the JNP6250G bi-articulated bus for 300 passengers with assistance from Neoplan.

Colombia
TransMilenio in Bogotá has operated bi-articulated buses since 2009, having purchased 120 by 2013. In 2020 it will receive a further 58.

Czech Republic
The Belgian manufacturer Van Hool offers a  bi-articulated bus with a capacity of about 180 passengers. This bus is used in Prague, with line 119 connecting the Václav Havel Airport Prague with the rest of the city.

Ecuador
Empresa de Pasajeros de Quito in Quito operates bi-articulated buses since 2016, having purchased 80. They are Volvo DH12D buses, model B340M EURO 3, with a diesel tank capacity of 120 gallons and a power of 340 HP. The chassis is a bi-articulated Volvo B340M.

France
The Swiss manufacturer Hess produces 22 bi-articulated lighTram 25TOSA electric. These units are used in the city of Nantes for the BusWay line 4, to replace the Mercedes-Benz Citaro G CNG of the line, which had become under capacity (these having been assigned to line 5). The line 4 carrying an average of 42,660 per day in 2018, the entry into service of the Hess buses taking place at the end of 2019.

The city of Metz and the Martinique island run Van Hool Exqui.City 24 hybrid diesel-electric and the city of Nîmes in the natural gas-electric version.

Germany
The Belgian manufacturer Van Hool offers a  bi-articulated bus with a capacity of about 180 passengers. These buses are used in the German cities of Aachen (lines 5 and 45) and Hamburg (Metrobus 5 and Eilbus E86), where single-articulated buses alone were not able to handle the huge number of passengers per day. In Hamburg they were retired in 2018 after 13 years of service as they started to require more and more maintenance due to their growing age and an unusual level of wear and tear, caused by the second articulation joint.

In 2012, Fraunhofer IVI introduced the AutoTram Extra Grand in Dresden. With overall length of  it is the longest bus in service with a passenger capacity of 256. Its unique 5-axle design is made possible using advanced computer controlled steering on the 3 trailing axles.

Luxembourg
The Swiss manufacturer Hess produces a bi-articulated, hybrid-engine bus based on the LighTram. This type is currently in use for the Luxembourgian bus operator Voyages Emile Weber.

Netherlands
The Belgian manufacturer Van Hool offers a  bi-articulated bus with a capacity of about 180 passengers. In September 2002, fifteen were deployed on lines 11 and 12 in Utrecht, connecting the central railway station to office, college and university buildings at the edge of the city. Twelve more have been added since.

From August 2014 to 2016, Swiss manufacturer Hess's bi-articulated LighTram buses were in service in Groningen, Netherlands on the route from the main train station via the city centre to the university north of the city. In 2016 these buses were moved to Utrecht because the few stops and higher speeds on this line made the hybrid engine perform poorly.

Norway
From August 2019 onwards, Trondheim have used Van Hool Exqui.City 24 CNG Hybrid on three core routes, known as the Metrobuss system.

Spain

Barcelona has had 24-meter long bi-articulated buses, running on fossil gas, on line H12 since May 2013.

Sweden
Volvo has manufactured several bi-articulated buses now in use in Gothenburg. They are based on Volvo's "puller"-type articulated, low-floor bus model with the internal combustion engine mounted on the floor on the side of the bus, and the cooling system on the roof. They have not manufactured anymore and are currently being replaced by normal articulated buses.

The city of Malmö is currently operating one bus line as a bus rapid transit route with 24 meter long, bi-articulated busses from Van Hool, and it is planned to upgrade further local bus routes with these bi-articulated busses.

Switzerland
The Swiss manufacturer Hess produces a bi-articulated trolleybus called LighTram that is in use in several Swiss cities, including Zürich, Geneva, Lausanne and Lucerne.

See also

 Autonomous Rail Rapid Transit
 Bombardier Guided Light Transit
List of buses
Road train
 Trailer bus

References

External links

Photo of an early Van Hool AGG300
Image gallery of Volvo BRT systems, some bi-articulated
Details of the Renault Heuliez Mégabus
Press release about introduction of Volvo bi-articulated buses in Gothenburg, Sweden
showing the articulation better
Youngman-Neoplan China (Flash + JavaScript)

 
Buses by type
French inventions